Richard Henry Mesak (March 1, 1920October 8, 2009) was an American football offensive tackle in the National Football League.

External links
Funeral Notice

1920 births
2009 deaths
Players of American football from San Francisco
American football offensive tackles
Detroit Lions players
Saint Mary's Gaels football players